Bushwacker (Carl Burbank) is a fictional supervillain appearing in American comic books published by Marvel Comics. The character is usually depicted as an adversary to the superhero, Daredevil, and less frequently to the Punisher and Wolverine.

Publication history

Created by Ann Nocenti and Rick Leonardi, the character made his first appearance in Daredevil #248 (Nov. 1987).

Fictional character biography
Carl Burbank was a priest who abandoned his vows following the drug-related deaths of young parishioners. He joined the C.I.A., which outfitted him with a cybernetic arm and made him an assassin under the codename "Bushwacker", but ultimately he became a freelancer.

At some point, an event took place that compelled Bushwacker to begin a war against all mutants. Bushwacker began hunting and assassinating mutants, most often those mutants whose abilities Bushwacker perceived as making them especially talented in "the arts". Bushwacker also claimed that he was paid large sums of money to kill mutants, but this has yet to be verified. Wolverine learned of Bushwacker's activities and began to hunt the killer. At the same time, Bushwacker's wife Marilyn believed her husband was insane and needed to be placed in a hospital. She sought aid from lawyer Matt Murdock (secretly the hero Daredevil). Bushwacker was tracked down and defeated by the two heroes, which left the right side of his face horribly scarred, and he was placed in police custody.

Later, Bushwacker joined with Typhoid Mary and other enemies of Daredevil in a plan to kill their common foe. After the completion of the plan, Bushwacker was left to his own activities.

Entering the Kingpin's employ, Burbank attacked the Punisher, but was left for dead. It was during this time that his wife finally left him. He reappeared in the employ of drug lord Nick Lambert, who hired Bushwacker to kill reporter Ben Urich, who was about to run a story of his illegal activities. Instead, when Bushwacker learned the truth, he allowed Urich to live and to complete the exposé. However, the drug lord managed to bribe himself out of jail. Bushwacker then killed him. Bushwacker was later freed by Deathlok from captivity by Mechadoom, a rogue Doombot variant.

Subsequent activities brought him into conflict with Daredevil, Nomad, the Punisher, Boomerang, and Elektra. His clash with Nomad was over the life of a baby that Nomad had taken under his care whom Bushwacker believed to be the daughter of Troy Donohue, Burbank's ex-brother-in-law (she was in the fact the daughter of Nomad's foe, the drug lord Umberto Saffilios and a teenaged prostitute). Bushwacker hoped that his wife would approve of his "rescue" and welcome him back into her life.

Imprisoned in the super-villain holding facility the Raft, Burbank escaped during the mass breakout engineered by Electro. Burbank was subsequently employed by the Jackal to kill the Punisher, but was defeated once again by Daredevil. Following this, Bushwacker created a disturbance in downtown Manhattan and took a woman hostage to lure the Punisher out of hiding and kill him. The Punisher showed up as expected. As it turns out, G.W. Bridge arranged the incident in Times Square with Bushwacker to ambush and capture The Punisher. Although complications arose by an on-site NYPD officer the incident fell through, the Punisher escaped, and Bushwacker was defeated by S.H.I.E.L.D. operative G. W. Bridge and put back in jail.

The Hood has hired him as part of his criminal organization to take advantage of the split in the superhero community caused by the Superhuman Registration Act. He helped them fight the New Avengers but was taken down by Doctor Strange.

As part of the Hood's gang, he later joins the fight against the Skrull invading force in New York City. He was with the Hood when he presented the Scorpion costume to whichever crook impressed him until the party was crashed by Scorpion, who stole the costume.

Bushwacker was seen during the Siege of Asgard as part of the Hood crime syndicate.

In X-Force: Sex and Violence #2, Bushwacker was seriously injured by Wolverine after an assassination attempt on him and Domino. He was stabbed with a middle claw to the throat.

During the "Civil War II" storyline, Kingpin encounters Bushwacker in San Francisco.

During a 2019 storyline in The Immortal Hulk, Bushwacker appeared to be killed when Hulk exploded after being bathed in too much Gamma radiation.

Powers and abilities
Bushwacker's arms and skin had been modified using malleable plastic that appears human, but has transformable biomolecular structure which affords him a great many unique powers and abilities. On top of this he has been altered bionically so that his hands can function as a gun, sword or other such armament he can think of.

Burbank can fire bullets from his index finger as if his hand were a pistol. With a thought, he can alter the configuration of his right or left arm, allowing either to function in several modes that replicate the effects of a number of weapons. Including a machine gun, shotgun or even energy based cannonry. He employs powerful gadgets and weapons, most notably a flamethrower, all of which can be created by the mechanical prostheses that have replaced his forearms. He manages to load the weapons by swallowing ammo, such as bullets or flamethrower fuel. There are some versions that take this a step further, having Bushwacker be able to use highly concussive energy weaponry (very similar to that of Iron Man or War Machine), and even be able to morph his arm into blades as a last resort. Bushwacker's skin can liquefy to seal wounds, he even boasts a kind of healing ability that can seemingly revive him even from fatal injury.

In the Daredevil vs. Punisher miniseries, it was implied that his powers are actually a natural mutation, making the assassin himself one of the mutants he hates so much.=

Bushwacker has been trained in CIA hand-to-hand combat techniques, and is trained in infiltration and assassination. He also has familiarity with the workings of international intelligence agencies and their methods.

Other versions

House of M
Bushwacker appeared in the House of M reality spin-off House of M: Masters of Evil.

In other media

Video games
 In the 1993 The Punisher arcade game, Bushwacker is working for the Kingpin.
 Bushwacker is a boss in the 2004 video game The Punisher, voiced by Phil Hayes. In this game, Bushwacker is a familiar foe to the Punisher, and works for Gnucci family.
 Bushwacker is one of several playable characters in the PlayStation 3 downloadable game The Punisher: No Mercy.

References

External links
 Bushwacker at Marvel.com
 Bushwacker at Marvel Wiki

Characters created by Ann Nocenti
Comics characters introduced in 1987
Fictional assassins in comics
Fictional Central Intelligence Agency personnel
Fictional gunfighters in comics
Fictional murderers
Fictional priests and priestesses
Marvel Comics characters who are shapeshifters
Marvel Comics characters with accelerated healing
Marvel Comics characters with superhuman strength
Marvel Comics cyborgs
Marvel Comics male supervillains
Punisher characters